Kamazan Rural District may refer to:
 Kamazan-e Olya Rural District
 Kamazan-e Sofla Rural District
 Kamazan-e Vosta Rural District